Glyn Harman (born 2 November 1956) is a British mathematician working in analytic number theory. One of his major interests is prime number theory. He is best known for results on gaps between primes and the greatest prime factor of p + a, as well as his lower bound for the number of Carmichael numbers up to X.  His monograph Prime-detecting Sieves (2007) was published by Princeton University Press. He has also written a book Metric Number Theory (1998). As well, he has contributed to the field of Diophantine approximation. 
Harman also proved that there are infinitely many primes (additive primes) whose sum of digits is prime. (the sequence A046704 in the OEIS).

Harman retired at the end of 2013 from being a professor at Royal Holloway, University of London. Previously he was a professor at Cardiff University.

Harman is married, and has three sons, and used to live in Wokingham, Berkshire before moving to Harrow, Middlesex/Greater London and then Uxbridge.

References

External links
 Home page of Glyn Harman

Academics of Royal Holloway, University of London
Academics of Cardiff University
Living people
20th-century British mathematicians
21st-century British mathematicians
Number theorists
1956 births
People educated at Ashford County Grammar School